Nüravud (also, Nuravad, Nuravud, Nuravut, and Nyuravud) is a village and municipality in the Lerik Rayon of Azerbaijan.  It has a population of 1,542.  The municipality consists of the villages of Nüravud, Köhnə Orand, Soruşçay, and Zərdəbərə.

References 

Populated places in Lerik District